The Evil Powers of Rock 'n' Roll is a studio album by the American rock and roll band Supersuckers. It was released on October 19, 1999, on Koch Records.

Production
The album was produced by Kurt Bloch. The band recorded the album twice, releasing the rerecorded version after Interscope refused to put out the original one.

Critical reception
The Guardian thought that "all of its songs sound like they're being played on the back of a speeding Harley Davidson on its way to ramraid the neighbourhood drugstore."

Track listing
"The Evil Powers of Rock 'n' Roll" – 3:05 
"Cool Manchu" – 3:06
"I Want the Drugs" – 1:21
"Santa Rita High" – 2:56
"Dead Meat" – 1:59
"Stuff 'n' Nonsense" – 2:35
"Dirt Roads, Dead Ends and Dust" – 3:44
"Fisticuffs" – 2:32
"Gone Gamblin'" – 2:24
"My Kickass Life" – 2:17
"Goin' Back to Tucson" – 2:20
"I Can't Hold Myself in Line" – 1:46
"Hot Like the Sun" – 5:04

Notes
"I Can't Hold Myself in Line" is a cover of a Merle Haggard song.

References

Supersuckers albums
1999 albums
E1 Music albums